The 2016 San Antonio FC season was the club's inaugural season. Including the San Antonio Thunder of the original NASL and the former San Antonio Scorpions of the modern NASL, this was the 7th season of professional soccer in San Antonio. The club played in the United Soccer League, the third tier of the United States soccer league system, and also participated in the U.S. Open Cup.

Background 

San Antonio was awarded the thirty-first USL franchise on January 7, 2016. The establishment of the club, along with the concurrent purchase of Toyota Field by the City of San Antonio and Bexar County, was part of a plan by local officials to obtain an expansion franchise in Major League Soccer. As a result, the San Antonio Scorpions franchise of the North American Soccer League was shut down. The club's first head coach, announced on January 7, 2016, was former Elon University men's soccer coach and Orlando City SC ProAcademy director, Darren Powell. On February 2, 2016, Carlos Alvarez became the club's first player signing.

The league expanded from 24 to 29 teams where San Antonio competed in the Western Conference of the USL.

Club

Coaching staff
{|class="wikitable"
|-
!Position
!Staff
|-
|Head coach|| Darren Powell
|-
|rowspan="2"|Assistant coach|| Nick Evans
|-
| Andy Thomson
|-
|Goalkeeper coach|| Juan Lamadrid
|-
|Fitness coach|| Andy Thomson
|-
|Team Physician|| Eliot Young, M.D.
|-
|Athletic Trainer||Jordan Harding
|-
|Assistant Athletic Trainer||Chris Ramos
|-
|Equipment Manager|| Rashad Moore
|-
|Pro Academy director|| Nick Evans
|-

Other information

|-

Squad information

First-team squad

Player movement

In

Out

Loan in

Loan out

Pre-season 
The pre-season match against Rayo OKC was announced by Rayo OKC on February 2, 2016. Remaining pre-season matches were announced on March 4, 2016, by SAFC.

Competitions

Overall 
Position in the Western Conference

Overview 

{| class="wikitable" style="text-align: center"
|-
!rowspan=2|Competition
!colspan=8|Record
|-
!
!
!
!
!
!
!
!
|-
| United Soccer League

|-
| U.S. Open Cup

|-
! Total

United Soccer League

League table

Results summary

Results by matchday 
Position in the Western Conference

Matches 
The 2016 schedule was released on January 26, 2016. Home team is listed first, left to right.

Kickoff times are in CDT (UTC−05) unless shown otherwise

Lamar Hunt U.S. Open Cup

Statistics

Appearances 
Discipline includes both league and Open Cup play.

Top scorers 
The list is sorted by shirt number when total goals are equal.

Clean sheets 
The list is sorted by shirt number when total clean sheets are equal.

Summary

Awards

Player

References

San Antonio FC seasons
San Antonio
San Antonio FC
San Antonio FC